"School's Out" is a song first recorded as the title track of Alice Cooper's fifth album. It was released as the album's only single on April 26, 1972. "School's Out" was Alice Cooper's biggest international hit and it has been regarded as his signature song and reached number 7 on the Billboard Hot 100, number 3 in the Canadian Hot 100, number 2 in Ireland and reached the top of the UK Singles Chart.

Swiss metal band Krokus released a charting cover version in 1986.

Inspiration and writing
Cooper has said he was inspired to write the song when answering the question, "What's the greatest three minutes of your life?". Cooper said: "There's two times during the year. One is Christmas morning, when you're just getting ready to open the presents. The greed factor is right there. The next one is the last three minutes of the last day of school when you're sitting there and it's like a slow fuse burning. I said, 'If we can catch that three minutes in a song, it's going to be so big."

Cooper has also said it was inspired by a line from a Bowery Boys movie. On his radio show, Nights with Alice Cooper, he joked that the main riff of the song was inspired by a song by Miles Davis. Cooper said that guitarist Glen Buxton created the song's opening riff.

The lyrics of "School's Out" indicate that not only is the school year ended for summer vacation, but ended forever, and that the school itself has been literally blown up. It incorporates the childhood rhyme, "No more pencils, no more books, no more teachers' dirty looks" into its lyrics. It also featured children contributing some of the vocals. "Innocence" in the lyric " ... and we got no innocence" is frequently changed in concert to "intelligence" and sometimes replaced with "etiquette." The song appropriately ends with a school bell sound that fades out.

Later performances saw Alice Cooper incorporate parts of the first verse of "Another Brick in the Wall, Part 2", a song by Pink Floyd (also about school, and produced by Bob Ezrin) into "School's Out".

Release and reception
"School's Out" became Alice Cooper's first major hit single, reaching #7 on the Billboard Hot 100 pop singles chart and propelling the album to #2 on the Billboard 200 pop albums chart. It was the highest-charting single for the Alice Cooper band, and its #7 peak position was matched only by "Poison" among Cooper's solo efforts. Billboard ranked it as the No. 75 song for 1972. In Canada, the single went to #3 on the RPM Top Singles Chart following the album reaching #1. In Britain, the song went to #1 on the UK Singles Chart for three weeks in August 1972. It also marked the first time that Alice Cooper became regarded as more than just a theatrical novelty act.

The single version of the song is a slightly sped-up narrow stereo remix of the album version with one major difference—the "turn-off" effect used upon the school bell and sound effects at the end of the album version is not used on the single version, allowing the school bell and effects to simply fade out.

Some radio stations banned the song from their airwaves, stating that the song gave the students an impression of rebelliousness against childhood education. Teachers, parents, principals, counselors, and psychologists also shunned the song and demanded several radio stations ban the song from ever being played on the air.

"School's Out" was ranked #326 on Rolling Stones list of The 500 Greatest Songs of All Time. In 2009 it was named the 35th best hard rock song of all time by VH1 and the song appeared on the TV show American Idol in 2010. The Guardian placed it as number 3 on its list of "The 20 best glam-rock songs of all time." In 2018, Ian Chapman and Pittsburgh Post-Gazette have called it a "glam rock anthem." Nick Talevski has called it a "hard rock anthem" on his book Rock Obituaries: Knocking On Heaven's Door. The Independent named the song at tenth in the list "Gold Dust: Glam rock's top 10 singles."

Use in popular media 
The song has been used in various movies including Scream, Dazed and Confused, Rock 'n' Roll High School, and I Love You, Beth Cooper.

The Season 4 premiere episode of The Simpsons, "Kamp Krusty", features the song in which Bart Simpson dreams that it is the last day of school and the students destroy the place.

In 2004, the song was also used in a Staples television commercial for the back to school retail period in which Cooper appeared as himself.

Personnel
 Alice Cooper – vocals
 Glen Buxton – lead guitar
 Michael Bruce – rhythm guitar, keyboards, backing vocals
 Dennis Dunaway – bass guitar, backing vocals
 Neal Smith – drums, backing vocals

Notable cover versions 
Krokus released the album Change of Address in 1986, which featured a cover of "School's Out". This version peaked at #67 on the Hot 100.
The Swedish pop group A-Teens released a cover version of the song, which features guest vocals by Cooper. This version appeared on their studio albums Pop 'til You Drop! and New Arrival.

Charts

Weekly charts

Year-end charts

Certifications

References

External links
 

1972 singles
UK Singles Chart number-one singles
Alice Cooper songs
Songs written by Dennis Dunaway
Songs written by Alice Cooper
Gwar songs
Song recordings produced by Bob Ezrin
Songs about school
1972 songs
Warner Records singles